The Migration Policy Institute (MPI) is a non-partisan think tank established in 2001 by Kathleen Newland and Demetrios G. Papademetriou. The Migration Policy Institute is supportive of liberal immigration policies.

About 
The Migration Policy Institute was established by Demetrios G. Papademetriou and Kathleen Newland in 2001. The Migration Policy Institute launched MPI Europe in 2011 in Brussels. Andrew Selee is the President of MPI. MPI publishes an online journal, the Migration Information Source, which provides information, thoughts, and analyses of international migration and refugee trends.

MPI organizes an annual Immigration Law and Policy Conference in cooperation with Georgetown University Law Center and the Catholic Legal Immigration Network, Inc.

References

External links
 The Migration Policy Institute

Non-profit organizations based in Washington, D.C.
Immigration political advocacy groups in the United States
Think tanks established in 2001
2001 establishments in Washington, D.C.
Migration studies